Serpocaulon eleutherophlebium is a species of fern in the family Polypodiaceae. It is native to Costa Rica, Panama, Colombia, Ecuador and Venezuela. Under the synonym Polypodium mindense, it was regarded as endemic to Ecuador.

References

Polypodiaceae
Flora of Costa Rica
Flora of Panama
Flora of Colombia
Flora of Ecuador
Flora of Venezuela
Taxonomy articles created by Polbot
Plants described in 1893
Taxobox binomials not recognized by IUCN